Ricardo Jesús Serna Orozco (born 21 January 1964) is a Spanish retired footballer who played mostly as a central defender.

In 12 La Liga seasons, he appeared in 281 matches for three clubs, scoring six goals and winning six major titles, including the 1992 European Cup with Barcelona.

Football career
Born in Seville, Andalusia, Serna started his professional career at Sevilla FC in 1982 at the age of 18, immediately breaking into the starting line up. After six years with his local club he was signed by La Liga giants FC Barcelona, receiving his first Spain national team callup the same year and appearing as a substitute in a 1990 FIFA World Cup qualifier against Northern Ireland in Seville (4–0 win); he earned a further five international caps, in a two-year span.

Serna played nearly 150 competitive games for Barcelona, winning two national championships, two Spanish Cups, one UEFA Cup Winners' Cup and one European Cup. He appeared sparingly in his final season, where he already played alongside former Sevilla defensive teammate Nando.

A part of Deportivo de La Coruña's Super Depor emergent sides, Serna could only appear once in the league in two years, retiring in 1997 after one year with RCD Mallorca in the second division and a further two in the lower leagues.

Honours
Barcelona
La Liga: 1990–91, 1991–92
Copa del Rey: 1989–90
Supercopa de España: 1991
UEFA European Cup: 1991–92
UEFA Cup Winners' Cup: 1988–89

References

External links

1964 births
Living people
Footballers from Seville
Spanish footballers
Association football defenders
La Liga players
Segunda División players
Segunda División B players
Sevilla FC players
FC Barcelona players
Deportivo de La Coruña players
RCD Mallorca players
Granada CF footballers
AD Ceuta footballers
Spain youth international footballers
Spain under-21 international footballers
Spain under-23 international footballers
Spain amateur international footballers
Spain international footballers
Spanish football managers
CD Toledo managers